Soviet Invasion or Soviet Offensive can refer to:

 Ukrainian–Soviet War (1917–1920), also known as the Soviet–Ukrainian War
 Soviet westward offensive of 1918–1919
 Second phase of the Polish–Soviet War (1920), when Soviet armies marched on Warsaw, Poland
 Red Army invasion of Azerbaijan (1920), also known as the Soviet-Azerbaijan War
 Red Army invasion of Armenia (1920), also known as the Soviet-Armenia War
 Red Army invasion of Georgia (1921), also known as the Soviet–Georgian War
 Soviet invasion of Poland (1939), a military operation during the early stages of World War II
 Soviet invasion of Estonia, Latvia, Lithuania and Finland (1939–40), several military operations during the early stages of World War II
 Anglo-Soviet invasion of Iran (1941), when British and Commonwealth forces and the Soviet Union invaded Iran during World War II
 Soviet Offensive (1941-1942)
 Soviet invasion of Manchuria (1945), part of the Soviet–Japanese War in World War II
 Warsaw Pact invasion of Czechoslovakia (1968), invasion of the Czechoslovak Socialist Republic
 Soviet–Afghan War (1979–1989)
 Soviet Invasion (album), an EP by the band Witchfinder General

See also
 Russian invasion (disambiguation)
 Invasion of Russia (disambiguation)
 Russian Expeditionary Force (disambiguation)